Mohallah Remania is the biggest residential area in Mian Channu city, Khanewal District, Pakistan. The population is exceeding from 25,000 to 60,000. This area is also considered as the below poverty line area of Mian Channu as the majority of the people living in it are poor.

References

Populated places in Khanewal District